Slovenia competed at the 2022 Winter Paralympics in Beijing, China which took place between 4–13 March 2022.

Competitors
The following is the list of number of competitors participating at the Games per sport/discipline.

Alpine skiing

Jernej Slivnik competed in alpine skiing. He also represented Slovenia at the 2018 Winter Paralympics held in Pyeongchang, South Korea.

See also
Slovenia at the Paralympics
Slovenia at the 2022 Winter Olympics

References

Nations at the 2022 Winter Paralympics
2022
Winter Paralympics